Sebastián Corda (born 29 June 1995) is an Argentine professional footballer who plays as a left-back for Instituto.

Career
Corda started his career with Comunicaciones. His first appearance for the club arrived during the 2015 campaign in the Copa Argentina, as featured for the full duration of a penalty shoot-out win over Liniers on 2 April 2015; he appeared in Primera B Metropolitana for the first time five months later with an eight-minute cameo in a 0–4 victory against Acassuso on 8 September. Corda didn't appear in the subsequent 2016, though did make forty-eight appearances across the following two campaigns; netting his first goal in the process, as he scored in a fixture with Fénix on 18 March 2018.

Career statistics
.

References

External links

1995 births
Living people
People from San Martín, Buenos Aires
Argentine footballers
Association football defenders
Primera B Metropolitana players
Club Comunicaciones footballers
Club Atlético Mitre footballers
Instituto footballers
Sportspeople from Buenos Aires Province